Jenő Szántay (10 March 1881 – 11 December 1914) was a Hungarian fencer. He competed in the individual sabre event at the 1908 Summer Olympics. He was killed in action during the Battle of Limanowa in World War I.

See also
 List of Olympians killed in World War I

References

External links
 

1881 births
1914 deaths
People from Limanowa
Hungarian male sabre fencers
Olympic fencers of Hungary
Fencers at the 1908 Summer Olympics
Austro-Hungarian military personnel killed in World War I